Airline High School is a secondary school located in Bossier City, Louisiana, United States.

Athletics
Airline High athletics competes in the LHSAA.

Championships
Football Championships
(1) State Championship: 1967

Basketball Championships
(1) Girls’ Basketball: 1992 (first girls' basketball 5-A state champions in LHSAA history)

Notable alumni
 Robert Adley, businessperson and politician
 Ryan Gatti, Robert Adley's successor as state senator for District 36 since 2016; Bossier City lawyer
 Larry Robinson, former professional basketball player
 David Toms, professional golfer

 Milo Clark, Founder of Pegasus Laboratories

 Todd Walker, former Major League Baseball player
 Alan Wheat, politician

References

External links
 School website

Schools in Bossier Parish, Louisiana
Public high schools in Louisiana